The 2022 Tour de France Femmes (officially Tour de France Femmes avec Zwift) was the first edition of the Tour de France Femmes, one of women's cycling's two grand tours. The race took place from 24 to 31 July 2022, and was the 16th event in the 2022 UCI Women's World Tour.

The race followed years of campaigning by the women's professional peloton for an equivalent race to the men's Tour de France, after historic attempts failed due to financial difficulties, limited media coverage and trademark issues. The race was organised by the Amaury Sport Organisation (ASO), which also organises the men's Tour de France.

At the start of the race, van Vleuten suffered from a stomach bug, causing her to lose almost a minute to some of her rivals for the maillot jaune. She was eventually able to recover as the race reached the mountains. On stage seven, van Vleuten attacked on the first climb, before riding solo for the last  to win the stage by more than three minutes, moving into the yellow jersey in the process. She confirmed her victory by winning her second consecutive stage the next day, which finished atop La Super Planche des Belles Filles. She put in a consistent performance during the first six stages, gaining time on some of her rivals for the podium before finishing in the top five on both mountain stages to seal her podium place.

In the race's other classifications, Marianne Vos of  won the points classification. She finished in the top five on each of the first six stages, taking two stage wins in the process. Vos also held the maillot jaune from the second stage to the sixth stage. Shirin van Anrooij of  took the white jersey as the winner of the young riders classification, which was awarded to the best-placed  rider under the age of 23.  won the teams classification as the team with the lowest aggregate time among their three best-placed riders. Vos also took the super-combativity award to add to her green jersey and two stage wins.

Overall, the race was highly praised by the public, media, teams and riders – with large crowds and high TV viewership. As the first official women's Tour de France since 1989, the race enjoyed substantial media coverage around the world. Race director Marion Rousse did note that there was room for improvement in future editions, and in women's cycling more generally.

Teams 

24 teams participated in the race. All 14 UCI Women's WorldTeams were automatically invited. They were joined by 10 UCI Women's Continental Teams – the three best 2021 UCI Women's Continental Teams (Ceratizit–WNT Pro Cycling, Parkhotel Valkenburg and Valcar–Travel & Service) received an automatic invitation, and the other seven teams were selected by Amaury Sport Organisation (ASO), the organisers of the Tour. The teams were announced on 30 March 2022. 144 riders started the race, from 25 nationalities – with the largest percentage being Dutch (20% of the peloton).

UCI Women's WorldTeams

 
 
 
 
 
 
 
 
 
 
 
 
 
 

UCI Women's Continental Teams

 
 Arkéa Pro Cycling Team

Route and stages 
In October 2021, the route was announced by race director Marion Rousse. The race started with a stage on the Champs-Élysées, earlier on the same day as the men's tour finished. The route included gravel sections in Champagne vineyards, stages in the Vosges mountains (including the longest, stage 5, of ), and a summit finish at La Super Planche des Belles Filles. The route was welcomed by the professional peloton, and campaigners such as Kathryn Bertine. The overall length of the event was also met with agreement, with some teams noting that they do not "yet have the staff or numbers ... for a three-week event."

These restrictions were criticised by the professional peloton and campaigners as "sexist".

Race overview

Ahead of the race, Annemiek van Vleuten, Elisa Longo Borghini, Ashleigh Moolman, Cecilie Uttrup Ludwig, Marta Cavalli and Katarzyna Niewiadoma were all named as pre-race favourites for the general classification, with Lorena Wiebes and Elisa Balsamo tipped for the points classification. The field of 144 was described as "packed with talent", with the top 28 riders in the UCI rankings all taking part.

Media coverage prior to the event was very positive, calling the race a "historic moment for women's cycling" and "game changing". However, there was some criticism regarding the €250,000 prize fund (compared to the €2.2m prize fund for the men's race). Riders from the Cyclists Alliance (a union representing the female peloton) stated that live TV coverage for races was their biggest priority, rather than prize money. ASO, the organisers of the race, noted that the prize fund was larger than men's races of similar length – such as the Critérium du Dauphiné.

Early stages 

Taking place earlier on the same day of the final stage of the men's Tour, stage 1 of the race started beneath the Eiffel Tower in Paris, before the riders tackled eight laps of a circuit around Champs-Élysées. In a sprint finish, Lorena Wiebes (Team DSM) outsprinted Marianne Vos (Jumbo–Visma) to take the first maillot jaune of the race, as well as the green jersey of the points classification. Stage 2 to Provins was marred by multiple crashes in the final , with Marta Cavalli, one of the favourites for the yellow jersey, having to abandon the race as a result. Another pre-race favourite, Annemiek van Vleuten (Movistar Team), also came close to abandoning the race after suffering from a stomach bug and being unable to eat or drink. In the final, Vos outsprinted a small group to take the yellow and green jerseys.

Stage 3 took place on rolling terrain, with a final loop into Épernay. On the Côte de Mutigny, the peloton split with a select group of seven riders containing most of the general classification (GC) contenders going off the front. On the final steep climb to the line, Cecilie Uttrup Ludwig outsprinted the group to take the stage, with the  classification now being led by Femke Gerritse (Parkhotel Valkenburg).

Stage 4 to Bar-sur-Aube was another hilly stage but it also involved four sectors of gravel (chemin blanc) in the final half of the stage. Multiple riders including Katarzyna Niewiadoma, Elisa Longo Borghini, Uttrup Ludwig and van Vleuten suffered punctures and other mechanicals but most of them were able to rejoin the peloton and not lose time. However, Mavi García was hit by her own team car while chasing back after a mechanical, causing her to lose a minute and a half. With around  remaining, Marlen Reusser attacked, riding solo to win the stage by nearly a minute and a half.

With around  left, a crash in the peloton took down several riders, with Emma Norsgaard having to abandon. In the final sprint, Wiebes took her second stage win from Balsamo and Vos. Stage 6 to Rosheim was a hilly stage, with four categorised climbs and another climb with bonus seconds at the top. On the descent of the penultimate climb, a small group including Wiebes and Lotte Kopecky crashed on the descent, with everyone involved finishing the stage. The early breakaway was caught in the closing kilometres, with the stage win coming down to a bunch sprint. Vos outsprinted Marta Bastianelli and Kopecky to win her second stage of the race.

Mountain stages 

Stages 7 and 8 took place in the Vosges mountains in Grand Est, with five category 1 climbs over the two days, and two summit finishes.

Stage 7 had  of vertical climbing including the Grand Ballon, and was considered as the queen stage of the race. On the first climb of the day, Vos in the maillot jaune was dropped, ensuring that the yellow jersey would change hands at the end of the day. Meanwhile, Wiebes abandoned the race, following her crash on stage 6. With  still to go, the race exploded as van Vleuten launched an attack on the Petit Ballon, with only Demi Vollering able to follow her move. A chase group with most of the other  contenders formed behind them. On the second climb of the day, the Col du Platzerwasel, van Vleuten dropped Vollering a kilometre from the top. On the final climb of the Grand Ballon, van Vleuten's lead over Vollering increased to almost four minutes. Van Vleuten lost some time to Vollering on the final plateau section, but she nevertheless powered away to a dominant stage win, 3' 26" ahead of Vollering, who took the polka-dot jersey as leader of the  classification. Despite losing the yellow jersey, Vos continued to hold the green jersey.Stage 8 was the second mountain stage of the Tour, with three categorised climbs. Much like stage 7 of the men's edition, the final kilometer featured an extended gravel section with gradients as high as 24 percent. On the first climb, no break had been established and Vollering was able to take maximum points to extend her lead in the  classification. With  to go, the maillot jaune, van Vleuten suffered a mechanical.  and  soon lifted the pace in the peloton, with van Vleuten being forced to chase a deficit of almost a minute. After a while, van Vleuten eventually made it back to the peloton right at the foot of the second climb, the Ballon d'Alsace. On the climb, van Vleuten made four more bike changes but she quickly made it back to the peloton each time. On the final climb to La Super Planche des Belles Filles, van Vleuten attacked from the peloton with  remaining. She passed the remnants of the breakaway while Vollering went in pursuit of the race leader. Much like the previous day, a chase group of  contenders formed behind the duo. Van Vleuten gradually extended her lead over Vollering towards the finish as she took her second successive stage win, sealing the Tour title in the process. Vollering finished 30 seconds down while also confirming her win in the  classification.

Summary 

In the final general classification, Annemiek van Vleuten (Movistar Team) won the Tour de France Femmes with an advantage over Demi Vollering of almost four minutes while Katarzyna Niewiadoma was third at more than six and a half minutes down. Vollering won the mountains classification while Marianne Vos and Shirin van Anrooij won the points and young riders classifications, respectively. Out of 144 starters, 109 finished the event.

Worldwide media coverage praised the event, with CNN calling the race a "rebirth" and Cycling Weekly stating that the race was a "huge step for the women's sport". Race director Marion Rousse stated that "it’s a proper Tour de France, with the caravan, the crowds, placards, flags" and Le Tour Entier co-founder Kathryn Bertine stating it was a "wonderful edition". Riders also praised the event, with Katarzyna Niewiadoma noting it was one of the hardest races that the women's peloton has taken part in, and fourth placed overall Juliette Labous (Team DSM) explained that she was surprised by the large crowds, stating “I didn’t expect this much, I knew there would be a lot of people but I didn’t expect as much as this."

Future improvements to the race were also discussed, including increasing the riders in each team, more days of racing (including an individual time trial and stages in the Alps or Pyrenees mountains), and increased sponsorship. It was also noted that work was still required to improve the competitive depth and "economic model" of the women's peloton.

Classification leadership

Final classification standings

General classification

Points classification

Mountains classification

Young rider classification

Team classification

Broadcasting 

Live television coverage was provided by France Télévisions in conjunction with the European Broadcasting Union. There was over 22 hours of live coverage over the 8 stages, with some viewers requesting that live TV coverage be expanded to encompass the entire length of the stage. The race was broadcast around the world, including on NBC's Peacock in the United States, on Eurosport across Europe and by a variety of national broadcasters such as France 3, RTVE and SBS.

Following the event, broadcasters reported high viewing figures. In France, France 3 reported an average of 2.25 million viewers over the eight stages (an 26% audience share), and a peak of 5.1 million watching the final part of stage 8 (a 45% audience share). This is just under half the audience of the men's tour. In the Netherlands, a 45% audience share was reported at peak times. Eurosport reported a reach of over 14 million across Europe.

References

External links 
 Tour de France Femmes – Official site

Tour de France Femmes
Tour de France Femmes
2022 Tour de France
Tour de France Femmes
Tour de France Femmes